István Blazsetin may refer to:

István Blazsetin (1941) (1941–2001), Croatian writer from Hungary
István Blazsetin (1963), Croatian poet and scientist from Hungary